Netia is a telecoms company which owns the second-largest fixed-line network in Poland. In 2006, Novator, a private equity investment firm based in Iceland and owned by Björgólfur Thor Björgólfsson, acquired a large stake in Netia. In 2007, Netia and Novator announced that they are going to build a 4th mobile network in Poland.

In 2009, Novator sold its 30.3% stake in the company to financial investors in 28 transactions amounting to 590 million zlotys ($164 million). In 2015, Polish billionaire Zbigniew Jakubas bought an additional 7.8 percent of the company from MCI Management for 158 million zlotys ($42 million), raising his stake to 33.7 percent and making him Netia's largest shareholder.

External links
 Netia web site

References

Telecommunications companies of Poland
Companies listed on the Warsaw Stock Exchange